The Lycée Louis-le-Grand, also referred to simply as Louis-le-Grand or by its acronym LLG, is a public Lycée (French secondary school, also known as sixth form college) located on rue Saint-Jacques in central Paris. It was founded in the early 1560s by the Jesuits as the Collège de Clermont, was renamed in 1682 after King Louis XIV ("Louis the Great"), and has remained at the apex of France's secondary education system despite its disruption in 1762 following the suppression of the Society of Jesus. It offers both a high school curriculum, and a Classes Préparatoires post-secondary-level curriculum in the sciences, business and humanities.

The admission process is based on academic grades, drawing from middle schools (for entry into high school) and high schools (for entry into the preparatory classes) throughout France. Its educational standards are highly rated and the working conditions are considered optimal, owing to a demanding recruitment of teachers. Louis-Le-Grand's students, occasionally referred to as magnoludoviciens, regularly top national rankings for baccalauréat grades (high school), number of Concours général laureates and entry into the grandes écoles (preparatory classes).

Location
Louis-le-Grand is located in the heart of the Quartier Latin, the centuries-old student district of Paris. It is surrounded by other storied educational institutions: the Sorbonne to its west, across rue Saint-Jacques; the Collège de France to its north, across ; the Panthéon campus of Paris 2 Panthéon-Assas University to its south, across rue Cujas; the former Collège Sainte-Barbe to its east, across ; and the Sainte-Geneviève Library to its southeast.

History

Jesuit college (1560-1762)

The  thus became the Jesuit order's first permanent home in Paris. It no longer exists following its annexation in the 17th century by the nearby , and stood on a location that is now part of the Lycée Saint-Louis.

The Parisian project was eagerly supported by Laynez, by then the Jesuits' Superior General, who wanted it to become "the most celebrated college of the Society". It was delayed, however, by dilatory initiatives by the Parliament of Paris, University of Paris, and local clergy, all of which opposed the Jesuits' establishment. In July 1563, the Jesuits were finally able to purchase the former Parisian estate of the bishop of Langres on rue Saint-Jacques, where its current  now stands, and started teaching there in late 1563 (Old Style). The new institution was named , in recognition of Duprat's support but also because one of the conditions that the Jesuits accepted to overcome local opposition was not to formally name the college after the Society of Jesus as they did elsewhere.

The college soon met considerable success, as it was both free and of high quality, disrupting the antiquated business models and longstanding conventions of the University of Paris. In particular, its theology course, led from the 1564 inception by Juan Maldonado, was so popular that the college's buildings were too small to contain the audience. Other prominent early faculty included Pierre Perpinien, Juan de Mariana, and Francisco Suárez.

The University of Paris had been hostile to the Jesuits from the start, in line with its general rejection of novel initiatives and long before that hostility took doctrinal undertones in the 17th and 18th centuries as the Jesuits became a key adversary for Jansenists. In 1554, the University's College of Sorbonne had already issued a negative opinion regarding the opening of a college in Paris. On , it refused to recognize it and thereby nullified the prior favorable decision of Poissy. While the courses were free of charge, boarding costs for the resident students, who typically came from elite families, were covered by gifts and scholarships, and the corresponding accounts were kept separate until the Jesuits' departure in 1762. In the 1580s, the college's students numbered in the thousands, of which several hundreds were resident ( and ). The faculty included several dozen Jesuit priests.

Unlike most colleges of the University, the Jesuit college remained open during the Siege of Paris in 1590, albeit with reduced activity, and inevitably colluded with the Catholic League, as did the University too. On , an alumnus of the college, Jean Châtel, attempted to assassinate King Henry IV. As a reaction, the king took the side of the Jesuits' longstanding accusers such as Parlement lawyer Antoine Arnauld, and expelled the Jesuits from France, including those in Paris. In 1595, the bibliothèque du roi was relocated into the college's premises and stayed there until 1603. That year, Henry allowed the Jesuits to return to France on the conditions that they be French nationals. They were allowed to retake the college building in 1606, and to fully restart their teaching in 1610. On , however, upon a new case brought by the University and in the changed political context resulting from Henry IV's assassination in May 1610 by François Ravaillac, the Parliament of Paris forbade the Jesuits from teaching in Paris.

Despite its near-continuous interruption between 1595 and 1618, the College de Clermont almost immediately recovered and reached an equivalent level of activity to its heyday of the 1570s and 1580s. Its adversaries made sure that it would still not obtain admission into the University, but otherwise their attempts to undermine it met with decreasing success, given the continuing support the Jesuits were able to secure from the monarchy and high nobility. The college was regularly bolstered by royal visits, including by Louis XIII in 1625 and Louis XIV in 1674. On the latter occasion, the king donated a painting by Jean Jouvenet, Alexander and the family of Darius, which remains to this day in the office of Louis-le-Grand's principal.

Several notable scholars were resident in the college, including mathematician Pierre Bourdin (1595-1653), historian Philippe Labbe (1607-1667), or latinist Charles de la Rue (1643-1725). Other faculty included author René Rapin (1621-1687), scientist Ignace-Gaston Pardies (1636-1673), historian Claude Buffier (1661-1737), theologian René-Joseph de Tournemine (1661-1739), sinologist Jean-Baptiste Du Halde (1674-1743), rhetorician Charles Porée (1675-1741), and humanist Pierre Brumoy (1688-1742). Composer Marc-Antoine Charpentier, who may have studied at the college, was its music master between 1688 and 1698. The college library had about 40,000 volumes as of 1718, and included unique manuscripts such as the Chronicle of Fredegar (occasionally known for that reason as ) or Anonymus Valesianus. As in other Jesuit colleges, theatrical representations became increasingly prominent during the 17th century. Also as in other colleges, in 1660 the Jesuits opened an observatory, and in 1679 they created the elaborate sundials, augmented in the 18th century, that survive to this day on the northern side of the  thanks to preservation campaigns in 1842 and 1988.

The college undertook a rebuilding campaign in 1628, on a design attributed to Paris municipal architect Augustin Guillain.

That act confirmed its royal patronage, despite the near-simultaneous Declaration of the Clergy of France and the kingdom's ongoing conflicts with the Papacy, to which the Jesuits were directly tied by their vows. Already in 1674, during his visit, Louis was said to have remarked  ("this is my college"). A black marble slab with the inscription COLLEGIVM LVDOVICI MAGNI (College of Louis the Great) was promptly placed on the façade, in substitution to the earlier text COLLEGIVM CLAROMONTANVM SOCIETATIS IESV, which triggered controversy. (The anecdote was narrated by Gérard de Nerval in his short story , published in 1852 in the collection titled .) The new inscription survived later turmoil, and was relocated on the eastern side of the  during the late-19th-century rebuilding.

In 1700, Louis-le-Grand took over the École des Jeunes de langues, founded in 1669 by Jean-Baptiste Colbert, in line with the Jesuits' leadership in studying foreign languages and foreign cultures, reinforced since 1685 with the permanent mission in China initiated by six Jesuits from Louis-le-Grand. Antoine Galland, the first Western European translator of One Thousand and One Nights, had studied in this section and taught Arabic there from 1709. In 1742 the college had five Chinese students: Paul Liu, Maur Cao, Thomas Liu, Philippe-Stanislas Kang, and Ignace-Xavier Lan, who had come from China via Macau together with Jesuit Father Foureau.

After 1762

The establishment was immediately nationalized and renamed . Teachers from the nearby  replaced the Jesuit fathers as faculty. This change triggered a broader reform of the University of Paris. By 1764, these students also boarded at Louis-le-Grand. By then, the  effectively ceased autonomous activity, after which their property were gradually sold. Louis-le-Grand thus became the center of the university, even though ten other  survived until 1792. Between then and the French Revolution, there were about 190  every year at Louis-le-Grand, and a smaller number of  whose families paid for their boarding.

As a broader consequence of the Jesuits' termination, the French state in 1766 initiated the  examination to raise the standards of teaching in secondary education. Louis-le-Grand aspired to a leading position in supplying future . Its ambitions failed to materialize, however, as only nine of its  succeeded in the  exams between 1766 and 1792, out of a total of 206 successful candidates during that period.

During and after the French Revolution, the college was renamed several times in response to France's changing politics:  in January 1793,  in 1797,  in July 1798,  in 1803,  in 1805,  in 1814,  in 1815,  in 1831,  in 1848,  in 1849,  in 1853, again  in 1870, and finally again  in 1873. It has kept that name ever since.

Throughout the troubled 1790s, it was the only Parisian educational institution that remained continuously open, as it had been during the 1590s siege of Paris. Part of its premises, however, were used as barracks for soldiers, then as political prison and workshops. In 1796, three more  opened in Paris, respectively in the former Abbey of Saint Genevieve (later Lycée Henri-IV), the Professed House of the Jesuits (later Lycée Charlemagne), and the Collège des Quatre-Nations. The latter building, however, was repurposed in 1801 for artistic training, and its secondary school was relocated to the  adjacent to Louis-le-Grand then known as the Prytanée, then merged into it in 1804. In 1803, Napoleon created the Lycée Condorcet in the former , and in 1820, another new  took the premises of the former , now the Lycée Saint-Louis. Louis-le-Grand was thus one of only five public  in Paris for most of the 19th century, until Jules Ferry's reforms greatly expanded secondary education in the 1880s.

Others parts of the Plessis complex were temporarily awarded to the Paris University's Faculty of Letters and a section of the Faculty of Law, but were demolished in 1833 as they had become derelict. During the early Second Republic, an  opened in July 1848 on the École Normale's former location, promoted by politician Hippolyte Carnot, but it met overwhelming opposition and ceased operating after about six months. Louis-le-Grand eventually acquired the remaining Plessis buildings in May 1849 and tore them down in 1864. Meanwhile in 1822, Louis-le-Grand had expanded southwards by taking over the former  from the University. Louis-le-Grand's main buildings themselves were in an increasingly dilapidated state, implying danger for the students. From the 1840s onwards multiple attempts were made to start their reconstructions, but faltered for several decades.

Eventually, Louis-le-Grand was almost entirely reconstructed between 1885 and 1898 on a design by architect , on a complex schedule so that teaching activities could continue during the works, and at a record high cost. Le Coeur's design only preserved the northern and southern sides of the inner court (now ) from the earlier college facilities. He created two vast courtyards to the north and south of that central space, with multiple levels of classrooms connected by airy arcaded corridors. That rebuilding project took place the context of broader urban remodeling of the neighborhood around rue Saint-Jacques, also including the rebuilding of the Sorbonne (1884-1901, architect Henri Paul Nénot) and the extension of what is now the Panthéon campus of Paris 2 Panthéon-Assas University (1891-1897, architect Ernest Lheureux).

During World War II, Jacques Lusseyran founded the resistance group Volontaires de la Liberté, in which a number of his fellow Louis-le-Grand students participated.

The last significant new building project was a new auditorium, located in the southeastern corner of the premises and completed in the late 1950s.

Louis-le-Grand had its share of May 68 turmoil and subsequent violence between far-left and far-right student factions. On , it hosted the general assembly of the high-school students' action committees which called for a general strike. A hand grenade exploded inside its premises in early May 1969.

Operations

Louis-le-Grand has about 1,800 students, nearly a tenth of which are non-French from more than 40 countries. Its boarding capacity is of 340 inside the building.

This exemption has been criticized as a breach of territorial equality and a device for the self-perpetuation of French elites. It was decided to reform it in 2022.

Notable alumni

Louis-le-Grand has long been considered to play an important role in the education of French elites. In 1762, just before the college's nationalization, scholar Jean-Baptiste-Jacques Élie de Beaumont wrote: "The Jesuit College of Paris has for a long time been a state nursery, the most fertile in great men." Many of its former students have become influential statesmen, diplomats, prelates, writers, artists, intellectuals and scientists.

It counts seven Nobel Prize laureates as alumni, second only to the Bronx High School of Science in New York City, and one Nobel Memorial Prize in Economic Sciences. The Louis-le-Grand alumni laureates are, by chronological order of prize-winning: Frédéric Passy (Peace, 1901); Henri Becquerel (Physics, 1903); Charles Louis Alphonse Laveran (Medicine, 1907); Paul d'Estournelles de Constant (Peace, 1909); Romain Rolland (Literature, 1915); Jean-Paul Sartre (Literature, 1964); Maurice Allais (Memorial Prize in Economic Sciences, 1988); and Serge Haroche (Physics, 2012).

Other notable alumni include: 
 statesmen the Cardinal de Fleury, the Duc de Choiseul, the Cardinal de Bernis, the Chancelier de Maupeou, Charles Carroll of Carrollton, Maximilien Robespierre, Camille Desmoulins, Victor Schœlcher, Jean Jaurès, Édouard Herriot, Edgard Pisani, Léopold Sédar Senghor, Jacques de Larosière, Paul Biya; seven French presidents (Raymond Poincaré, Paul Deschanel, Alexandre Millerand, Alain Poher acting, Georges Pompidou, Valéry Giscard d'Estaing and Jacques Chirac); and eight Prime Ministers (Paul Painlevé, Pierre Mendès France, Michel Debré, Maurice Couve de Murville, Pierre Messmer, Laurent Fabius, Michel Rocard, Alain Juppé)
 scientists Évariste Galois, Charles Hermite, Henri Poincaré, Jacques Hadamard, Benoit Mandelbrot, Laurent Schwartz, Laurent Lafforgue, Cédric Villani, Hugo Duminil-Copin
 writers Molière, Bussy-Rabutin, the Marquis de Sade, Victor Hugo, Théophile Gautier, Charles Baudelaire, Paul Claudel, Joseph Kessel, Roland Barthes, Aimé Césaire
 philosophers and social scientists Voltaire, Denis Diderot, Emile Durkheim, Gaston Maspero, Marc Bloch, Julien Benda, Georges Dumézil, Jacques Derrida, Jacques Le Goff, Régis Debray, Thomas Piketty
 business leaders André Citroën, André Michelin, Michel Pébereau, Jean-Charles Naouri
 military leaders Maxime Weygand, Henri Honoré d'Estienne d'Orves
 religious figures Francis de Sales, Pierre de Bérulle, the Cardinal de Retz, Dalil Boubakeur

Offshoots

Gentilly estate (1638-1770)

The  made a series of purchases in Gentilly to establish a rural retreat there, in 1632, 1638, 1640 and 1659, thus forming a major property that was eventually sold after the order's suppression in the early 1770s. One of its buildings survives and has been repurposed in the 1990s as the Maison de la photographie Robert Doisneau.

in Vanves (1853-1864)

In 1853 this became the sole location of its  or middle school. The facilities were expanded in 1858-1860 on a design by Joseph-Louis Duc. It became an independent establishment by imperial decree in August 1864, known since 1888 as the Lycée Michelet.

on the Jardin du Luxembourg (1885-1891)

In 1882, a law awarded a former tree nursery ground of the Jardin du Luxembourg to Louis-le-Grand for the creation of new classrooms, in anticipation of the main building's reconstruction.

Abu Dhabi Section (2008-2017)

In September 2008, Louis-le-Grand and the Abu Dhabi Education Council launched the Advanced Math and Science Pilot Class, with one class of 20 girls and another of 20 boys. Classes were taught in English in Abu Dhabi, by professors sent from France. The students who made up the Advanced Math and Science Pilot Class graduated at the end of the 12th grade and were awarded a certificate of academic recognition by Louis-le-Grand. The final cohort of the program graduated in 2017, marking the end of the program.

Gallery

See also

 List of Lycée Louis-le-Grand people
 List of Jesuit sites
 College of Navarre
 Lycée Henri-IV
 Secondary education in France
 List of schools in France

References

External links

(These pages are in French)
 Lycée Louis-le-Grand (official website)
 Homepage of the parents' association FCPE
 Homepage of the parents' association PEEP

 
1563 establishments in France
Buildings and structures in the 5th arrondissement of Paris
Jesuit secondary schools in France
Jesuit universities and colleges
Educational institutions established in the 1560s